Niccoló Zanellato (born 24 June 1998) is an Italian footballer who plays as a midfielder for Serie B club SPAL.

Club career
Zanellato is a Milan's youth academy graduate. He received his first-ever call-up to the senior team from the head coach Vincenzo Montella ahead of the away Serie A game against Cagliari played on 28 May 2017; he, however, remained an unused substitute. He made his UEFA Europa League debut on 24 August 2017 against KF Shkëndija, playing the entire game as Milan won 1-0.

On 30 January 2018, he was signed by Crotone on a six-months loan with an obligation to buy.

On 29 January 2022, he signed with SPAL until 30 June 2024.

International career 
He made his debut with the Italy U21 on 6 September 2019, in a friendly match won 4–0 against Moldova.

Career statistics

References

1998 births
Living people
Italian footballers
Italy under-21 international footballers
Association football midfielders
A.C. Milan players
F.C. Crotone players
S.P.A.L. players
Serie A players
Serie B players